An antipope is a historical papal claimant not recognized as legitimate by the Catholic Church. Unlike papal tombs, the tombs of antipopes have generally not been preserved, with a few notable exceptions.

Several tombs of antipopes were desecrated and destroyed, often by their rival claimants, shortly after their creation. For example, Pope Innocent II razed Santa Maria in Trastevere (one of the main Marian basilicas and one of the oldest churches of Rome) to the ground and was eventually buried over the spot once occupied by the tomb of his rival, Pope Anacletus II. Others survived centuries, only to be destroyed during conflicts such as the French Revolution and the War of the Spanish Succession, a fate common to some non-extant papal tombs. Such was the case with the tomb of Antipope Felix V (the last historical antipope), who was buried with most of his predecessors as Count of Savoy in Hautecombe Abbey.

Others are obscure because of the damnatio memoriae surrounding the lives of antipopes, or because they were refused burial due to excommunication. Some of those can be presumed to have been buried unceremoniously in the monasteries to which the antipopes were confined after submitting or losing power. The exception is Hippolytus of Rome, the first antipope, who was translated to Rome by his former rival Pope Fabian following his martyrdom, and is regarded as a saint.

Various antipopes, however, received prominent burials, including one among the papal tombs in Old St. Peter's Basilica (which were destroyed during the sixteenth/seventeenth century demolition). In particular, the conciliar claimants of the Western Schism were entombed in elaborate tombs in important churches by famous sculptors. The tomb of Antipope John XXIII typifies political iconography of antipapal burial, subtly arguing for the legitimacy of the entombed.

Notes

References
Reardon, Wendy J. 2004. The Deaths of the Popes. Macfarland & Company, Inc. 

 
 
Antipopes
Antipopes
Antipopes
Tombs, antipopes
Antipopes